Aero Elite: Combat Academy, known in Japan as , is a combat flight simulator developed by Sega AM2 and published by Sega for PlayStation 2. It is the fourth and final game in the AeroWings/Aero Dancing series. It features over 60 planes to fly (including Mig 29, SU27, Mirage2000, Harrier, A10, Tornado, etc.) and new features like the "scramble" mode - a random interception mission where a player must take off, intercept an unknown intruder plane, take pictures to identify it, then return to the base and land to finish the mission.

Reception

The game received "mixed" reviews according to the review aggregation website Metacritic. In Japan, Famitsu gave it a score of 30 out of 40.

References

External links
Official Japanese website

2002 video games
Combat flight simulators
Multiplayer and single-player video games
PlayStation 2 games
PlayStation 2-only games
Sega video games
Video game sequels
Video games developed in Japan